Daniel Kent Neil Johnson (born c. 1969) is a Canadian-American microeconomist and entrepreneur. He is currently an associate professor in the economics department at Colorado College. His most notable research has been in predicting Olympic medals.

Research 
Johnson's Olympic Medals Model uses five variables: country's per-capita income, population, political structure, climate, and host-nation advantage. The model does not take into account athletic abilities of any star Olympians. It has demonstrated 94% accuracy for predicting national medal counts and 87% accuracy for gold medal counts. Since 2000, Johnson's model has become increasingly more accurate at predicting the number of gold medals a country will win, while becoming marginally less accurate at predicting the total number of medals.

Johnson's other work is in microeconomic analysis, with emphasis on business development. He has worked in the areas of commodity analysis, technology growth, and innovation, among others.

Entrepreneurship 
In 2012, Johnson formed BookCheetah, an online textbook trading service.

Selected publications 
 'Learning-by-Licensing': R & D and Technology Licensing in Brazilian Invention
 A Tale of Two Seasons: Participation and Medal Counts at the Summer and Winter Olympic Games
 Time in Purgatory: Determinants of the Grant Lag for U.S. Patent Applications
 Are Many Heads Better than Two? Recent Changes in International Technological Collaboration
 Selling Ideas: The Determinants of Patent Value in an Auction Environment
 Fueling the Innovative Process: Oil Prices and Induced Innovation in Automotive Energy-Efficient Technology
 Semester, Trimester or Block Plan? Retention of Economics Principles by Undergraduates on Alternative Curricular Structures
 Lending a Hand: A Quantile Regression Analysis of Micro-Lending's Poverty Impact
 Financing Environmental Improvements: A Literature Review of the Constraints on Financing Environmental Innovation
 Thought for Food: A New Dataset on Innovation for Agricultural Use

Selected Awards and Honors 
 Ontario Scholar, 1987
 University of Ottawa Academic Scholar, 1987–91
 University of Ottawa Gold Medal, top standing in Honors Social Sciences, 1991
 Yale Academic Scholar, 1992–96
 International Honor Society in Economics Merit Certificate, 1995
 John F. Enders Research Fellow, 1996
 National Science Foundation Awards for Integration of Research & Education, 1999-2003
 Banco do Brasil / University of Brasilia Economics Prize, 2003

References

External links 
 Olympic Medal Predictions

21st-century American economists
Canadian economists
Colorado College faculty
Alumni of the London School of Economics
Yale Graduate School of Arts and Sciences alumni
University of Ottawa alumni
1969 births
Living people